Lu Rongting (September 9, 1859 – November 6, 1928), also spelled as Lu Yung-ting and Lu Jung-t'ing, was a late Qing/early Republican military and political leader from Wuming, Guangxi. Lu belonged to the Zhuang ethnic group.

Life

Late Qing Era 
Lu Rongting came from a peasant family and joined secret societies (Hui Dang) during his youth in order to make a living. He surrendered to the Qing army at Shuikou Pass in 1882 and joined the local chapter of the Tiandihui. He became a regular in the Qing army after the outbreak of the Sino-French War in 1884. After the end of the war, he was dismissed and he subsequently returned to banditry. His main efforts were focused on harassing the French army, which made him popular among the locals.

In 1894, Lu Rongting was co-opted (zhao'an) into the army of Guangxi's Provincial military commander (广西提督) Su Yuanchun (苏元春) and received a Guandai (管带). After this he was relegated to the regular Qing army. Between 1903-05 he actively participated in the suppression of anti-Qing revolutionaries and massive secret society uprisings in Guangxi. In the fall of 1904 Viceroy of Liangguang Cen Chunxuan appointed him commander of the 4000-man Guangxi Border Guards (Rongziying 荣字营) unit. This army would later form the core of the Old Guangxi clique, a faction led by Lu.

In December 1907 Long Jiguang and Lu Rongting led Qing forces in suppressing the Zhennanguan Uprising. The successful suppression of the revolt led by Sun Yat-sen and Huang Xing consequently forced Sun to flee to Singapore, and he did not return to China until the Wuchang Uprising. The Qing court awarded Lu with the Baturu title. With Long Jiguang leaving for the position of Viceroy of Guangdong, Lu was promoted to become the Viceroy of Guangxi.

Leader of the Old Guangxi Clique 
In July 1911, following the Wuchang Uprising, Guangxi Gov. Chen Bingkun proclaimed independence and formed the Guangxi military government. Following the departure of Shen Bingkun and Wang Zhixiang, Lu assumed control over Guangxi province.

On 8 February 1912 President Yuan Shikai formally appointed Lu the governor of Guangxi. In the KMT-initiated "second revolution" in 1913, Lu sided with Yuan Shikai and suppressed the Nationalist revolutionaries in Guangxi.

Soon afterwards Cai E and Tang Jiyao (Yunnan Clique) started the National Protection War and Lu joined them against Yuan's monarchial ambitions (Hongxian emperor). In the process Cen Chunxuan, an enemy of Yuan Shikai, was secretly recruited by Lu. Some scholars have suggested the reason for Lu's sudden change in allegiance was due to his discontent about Yuan's preferential treatment, which prevented him from expanding his influence into Guangdong. Nevertheless, the National Protection War led to the abdication of Yuan Shikai.

Long Jiguang proclaimed Guangdong's independence from Yuan on 6 April 1916. With the death of Yuan Shikai in June, Lu and Li Liejun attacked Long and forced him to retreat to Hainan. In the same year Lu assumed the position of governor of Guangdong province. His control and jurisdiction over both Guangdong and Guangxi was affirmed by new president Li Yuanhong in April 1917.

Start of the Warlord Era 

Sun Yat-sen initiated the Constitutional Protection Movement in 1917, and Lu played an important role. Under the military reorganization in 1918, Tang Jihao and Lu were appointed joint chiefs. This organization was instrumental in establishing peace between the Beijing government (under the Zhili Clique) and the Constitutional Protection Movement armies.

However, schisms within the movement appeared, with Sun opposing  Lu's (Old Guangxi Clique) nuanced stance against the Zhili Clique-led government in Beijing. Furthermore, the people of Guangdong  gradually became opposed to Lu's control over the province. By July 1920 Chen Jiongming (with Sun's support) ousted Lu and Cen Chunxuan from Guangdong.

Military Comeback 
After Lu's loss in Guangdong, he gained the support of the Beiyang government in an attempt to recover the province. In June 1921, the second conflict between the Old Guangxi Clique and Guangdong took place. However, due to defections within his own army and the loss of the strategic city of Chongzuo in September, Lu declared his decision to step down from the governorship in Nanning, and he subsequently fled to Shanghai.

Due to the polarization of relations between Chen Jiongming and Sun Yat-sen, Lu was re-appointed to become governor of Guangxi province in 1923 by the Beiyang government. However, he was unable to fully recover his influence over the province due to the formation of the New Guangxi Clique led by Li Zongren and Bai Chongxi.

Within Southern China three forces emerged, the most powerful led by the coalition of Lu and followed by Shen Hongying and the New Guangxi Clique. In 1924 Lu's forces were surrounded by Shen's troops and at the same time were under attack by the New Guangxi Clique. Nanning was lost to the New Guangxi Clique and by August that year Lu had also lost Guilin to Shen. Facing defeat, he fled to Yongzhou, Hunan, and officially announced his defeat and departure from politics on 9 October 1924. On 6 November 1928 he died in Shanghai from illness.

Family 
 Brother-in-law: Tan Haoming
 Son-in-law: Long Yungan (Son of Long Jinguang)
 Son: Lu Yuguang

Legend 
There was a legend saying that Lu has once reached a fortune teller in Guangzhou. However, in order not to let others discover his identity, he dressed up like a poor person. The fortune teller immediately recognized him despite his disguise, and then ridiculed him by telling him that he will have big trouble in the future. Later, he was defeated by other cliques and has fallen from power ever since, which made the fortune teller's prophecy become true.  This legend has then become a xiehouyu in Cantonese, meaning that someone is asking for trouble.

References 

1859 births
1928 deaths
Republic of China warlords from Hunan
Zhuang people
Politicians from Chenzhou
Viceroys of Liangguang
Empire of China (1915–1916)
Marshals of China